Horst is a hill in the Vogelsberg of Hesse, Germany.

Hills of Hesse
Mountains and hills of the Vogelsberg